Saint-Germain-du-Bel-Air is a commune in the Lot department in south-western France.

Geography
The village lies in the middle of the commune, on the left bank of the Céou, which flows westward through the commune.

See also
Communes of the Lot department

References

Saintgermaindubelair